The Tirupalliyeḻuchi, also rendered Tirupalli Eluchi, is a work of Tamil Hindu literature written by Thondaradippodi Alvar, comprising ten hymns. The title of this work is a reference to the act of Suprabhatam, the prayer at dawn that is expected to rouse Vishnu from his sleep and protect the world, a Sri Vaishnava ritual. The work is part of the compendium of the hymns of the Alvars, known as the Naalayira Divya Prabandham. 

Tirupalliyeḻuchi, as a ritual, is performed prominently throughout the month of Margaḻi in the Vishnu temples of South India.

Hymns 
The first hymn of this work begins as follows:

The fourth hymn makes references to the avataras of Rama and Krishna:

See also 

 Periya Tirumoli
 Tiruvaymoli
 Amalanatipiran

References 

Naalayira Divya Prabandham
Tamil Hindu literature
Vaishnava texts